The 2019–20 Ohio State Buckeyes men's basketball team represented Ohio State University in the 2019–20 NCAA Division I men's basketball season. Their head coach was Chris Holtmann, in his third season with the Buckeyes. The Buckeyes played their home games at Value City Arena in Columbus, Ohio as members of the Big Ten Conference. They finished the season 21–10, 11–9 in Big Ten play to finish in a four-way tie for fifth place. Following the regular season, the Big Ten tournament was canceled due to the ongoing COVID-19 pandemic. Shortly thereafter, all postseason tournaments were canceled due to the pandemic, ending the Buckeyes' season.

Previous season
The Buckeyes finished the 2018–19 season 20–15, 8–12 in Big Ten play to finish in a tie for eighth place. As the No. 8 seed in the Big Ten tournament, they defeated Indiana in the second round 79-75 before losing to Michigan State in the quarterfinals 77–70. They received an at-large bid to the NCAA tournament as the No. 11 seed in the Midwest region. There they upset Iowa State in the First Round before losing to Houston in the Second Round.

Offseason

Departures

Coaching changes
In April 2019, assistant coach Mike Schrage was hired as the new head coach at Elon. Holtmann hired Jake Diebler as Schrage's replacement later that month.

Incoming transfers

2019 recruiting class

2020 Recruiting class

Roster

Schedule and results

|-
!colspan=9 style=| Exhibition

|-
!colspan=9 style=| Regular season

|-
!colspan=9 style=|Big Ten tournament

Rankings

*AP does not release post-NCAA Tournament rankings

Individual awards

References

Ohio State Buckeyes men's basketball seasons
Ohio State
Ohio State Buckeyes
Ohio State Buckeyes